Aeneas Chisholm may refer to:

 Aeneas Chisholm (Vicar Apostolic of the Highland District) (1759–1818), Scottish Roman Catholic bishop
 Aeneas Chisholm (bishop of Aberdeen) (1836–1918), Scottish Roman Catholic bishop